The third and final season of the American streaming television series Daredevil, which is based on the Marvel Comics character of the same name, follows Matt Murdock / Daredevil, a blind lawyer-by-day who fights crime at night. When Wilson Fisk is released from prison, Murdock must decide between hiding from the world or embracing his life as a hero vigilante. The season is set in the Marvel Cinematic Universe (MCU), sharing continuity with the films and other television series of the franchise. It was produced by Marvel Television in association with ABC Studios, with Erik Oleson serving as showrunner and series creator Drew Goddard acting as a consultant.

Charlie Cox stars as Murdock, and Vincent D'Onofrio portrays Fisk, with Deborah Ann Woll, Elden Henson, and Stephen Rider also returning from previous seasons; Joanne Whalley, Jay Ali, and Wilson Bethel join them. Former series regular Ayelet Zurer also returns in a guest role. The season was ordered in July 2016, with Oleson announced as the new showrunner for the season in October 2017. Filming began the following month and ended by June 2018, with the season adapting elements from the "Born Again" comic storyline.

The 13-episode season was released on October 19, 2018. Netflix canceled the series on November 29, 2018. Daredevil: Born Again, a revival series produced by Marvel Studios for Disney+, was announced in July 2022.

Episodes

Cast and characters

Main
 Charlie Cox as Matt Murdock / Daredevil
 Deborah Ann Woll as Karen Page
 Elden Henson as Franklin "Foggy" Nelson
 Joanne Whalley as Maggie Grace
 Jay Ali as Rahul "Ray" Nadeem
 Wilson Bethel as Benjamin "Dex" Poindexter
 Stephen Rider as Blake Tower
 Vincent D'Onofrio as Wilson Fisk / Kingpin

Recurring
 Peter McRobbie as Paul Lantom
 Danny Johnson as Benjamin Donovan
 Stephen Rowe as Nicholas Lee
 Kate Udall as Tammy Hattley
 Sunita Deshpande as Seema Nadeem
 Noah Huq as Sami Nadeem
 Geoffrey Cantor as Mitchell Ellison
 Peter Halpin as Theo Nelson
 Amy Rutberg as Marci Stahl
 Holly Cinnamon as Julie Barnes
 Royce Johnson as Brett Mahoney
 Joe Jones as Felix Manning
 Kelly McAndrews as Mrs. Shelby

Notable guests
 Matt Gerald as Melvin Potter
 John Patrick Hayden as Jack Murdock
 Annabella Sciorra as Rosalie Carbone
 Ron Simons as Strieber
 Ayelet Zurer as Vanessa Marianna-Fisk

Production

Development
At San Diego Comic-Con International 2016, Marvel and Netflix revealed the series had been renewed for a third season, with the expectation that Doug Petrie and Marco Ramirez would return as showrunners from the second season. In October 2017, it was announced that Erik Oleson would replace Petrie and Ramirez as showrunner for the season. The season had yet to be scheduled for release by the end of July 2018, and television critics wondered whether the quality of the season was to blame on this. Netflix VP Cindy Holland responded that the scheduling of the various Marvel Netflix series, especially the crossover miniseries The Defenders which required cast members from all of the series to come together, was to blame for the delay, and that the company had no issue with the quality of the season; on the contrary, Holland described the season as "fantastic" and felt it was a "real return to form" for the series.

Writing
The ending of the miniseries The Defenders, which sees Matt Murdock waking up in a convent surrounded by nuns after being presumed dead, implied elements of the season would be inspired by the "Born Again" story arc. Charlie Cox was excited to adapt "Born Again", calling it "an amazing story" and that the implications of the story on the season "would be  exciting". He cautioned, however, that it would not be a "page-for-page" adaptation, "because if you do [that], then you become a foregone conclusion. There may be elements from "Born Again", but I'm sure there will be elements that are unfamiliar and surprising and different in order for the show to be compelling to fans who know the comics very well." Oleson crafted an original story for the season, taking "pieces of some of my favorite comic book runs, that told a larger story". When pitching his ideas to Marvel, Oleson expected "more pushback" from them, but said "Marvel was incredibly excited about the storyline" and gave him "complete freedom". Executive producer Jeph Loeb did note that despite this apparent freedom, Oleson was still required to deal with Murdock's death in The Defenders which was part of "a fairly good idea as to what [Marvel] wanted to tackle in terms of story" before Oleson presented his ideas. Oleson drew inspiration from "Born Again" and "Guardian Devil" for the tone of the season. Building the season structurally, Oleson felt if any viewer was "a devout Catholic... you could read into the events of the early episodes as a message from God to Matt".

At the start of the season, Oleson noted that Murdock would be "broken physically, broken emotionally, and broken spiritually", with his heightened senses failing him. Oleson added, "He's angry at God, he's angry at the fact that he had risked his life to do God's work, and he's questioning whether or not he was a fool." This results in Murdock donning his original black suit, similar to the one he wore in season one, since he "goes to pretty much the darkest place you can" and is at a point, Oleson notes, "[w]hen he realizes that he's incapable of being Daredevil, [and] he would rather just end it than go forward in his life without abilities." This also allowed Oleson to return the character "to the core idea" of being a boxer's son, "where his fighting style was more brutal and kind of close in combat". Oleson also wanted "to make the action sequences matter in ways that reflected on characters, or had real stakes". He added, "the best writing is one where the action sequences are an inherent part of the story and you cannot predict that the action is going to turn out a certain way."

Regarding the return of Wilson Fisk / Kingpin, Oleson called him "smarter, more calculated, and more manipulative", and felt his inclusion allowed the ability to "tell a story that’s relevant to the world around us. I looked at the show as a way to examine how tyrants manipulate in order to push their own agenda and cause fear and distrust." Loeb felt the season went "back to the world of the crime story". Karen Page's backstory is further explored in the season, with Woll explaining it reveals "why shooting someone [James Wesley] and covering it up is a bit more in her wheelhouse," while Foggy Nelson's family and additional backstory is also seen. All of the supporting characters in the season were treated "as emotionally real people as opposed to treating them as props or devices". Oleson wanted them to be "the protagonist of their own journey", modeling this approach after the series Breaking Bad, Game of Thrones, The Sopranos, and The Wire.

Benjamin "Dex" Poindexter does not go by Bullseye in the season. In the season's final sequence, Dex's spine is being operated on before the camera zooms into his face and a bullseye appears in his eye. Oleson "was very interested in telling an origin story not only about how a character we know from the comics as a full-blown psychopath and killer, but how somebody in real life could be turned into something like that." This origin also spoke to the overall theme for the season of fear, which touched the story arcs of Murdock, Page, and Fisk as well. Psychiatrists and psychologists were consulted to help create "a realistic portrait of Dex and how he might be able to turn into Bullseye".

Casting
Cox, Woll, Henson, and D'Onofrio all return in the season, reprising their roles as Matt Murdock / Daredevil, Karen Page, Foggy Nelson, and Wilson Fisk / Kingpin, respectively. Rider also returns as Blake Tower. In November 2017, Wilson Bethel was cast as a new series regular, Benjamin "Dex" Poindexter, and in January 2018, Joanne Whalley was revealed to have been cast as Maggie Grace, a nun who cares deeply about Murdock's safety; she was mentioned at the end of The Defenders. Jay Ali was cast as Rahul "Ray" Nadeem, another FBI agent, by March.

Recurring characters in the season include Peter McRobbie as Paul Lantom, Danny Johnson as Benjamin Donovan, Geoffrey Cantor as Mitchell Ellison, Amy Rutberg as Marci Stahl, and Royce Johnson as Brett Mahoney, all of whom are reprising their roles from earlier seasons. Other recurring characters include Stephen Rowe as Nicholas Lee, one of Fisk's lawyers; Kate Udall as Tammy Hattley, the Special Agent in Charge of the FBI; Sunita Deshpande as Seema Nadeem and Noah Huq as Sami Nadeem, Ray's wife and son, respectively; Peter Halpin as Theo Nelson, Foggy's brother created for the series; Holly Cinnamon as Julie Barnes, a friend of Dex; Joe Jones as Felix Manning, Fisk's fixer; Kelly McAndrews as Mrs. Shelby, Fisk's surveillance technician; and Matthew McCurdy, Don Castro, Scotty Crow, Richard Prioleau, David Anthony Buglione, Sam Slater, and Andrew Sensenig as FBI agents Wellers, Arinori, Lim, Doyle, Johnson, O'Connor, and Winn, respectively.

Characters making guest appearances from the first two seasons and other MCU media include Matt Gerald as Melvin Potter, John Patrick Hayden as Jack Murdock, Annabella Sciorra as Rosalie Carbone, following up on her character's introduction in the second season of Luke Cage, Ron Simons as NYPD captain Strieber, following his appearance in The Defenders, and former main cast member Ayelet Zurer as Vanessa Marianna-Fisk.

Former Daredevil comic writer and editor Roy Thomas has a cameo appearance as a prison inmate in "Blindsided".

Design
Costume designer Liz Vastola noted Daredevil's black suit was "purposely ripped and jagged to highlight Matt’s state of mind" throughout the season. Vastola described Page's wardrobe as "fucking fierce" as Page transitions into more of an investigative journalist. Foggy Nelson's look is a "complete 180" from what he was wearing in season one, with the character now wearing suits made by Martin Greenfield Clothiers.

Filming
Filming for the season began on November 13, 2017, in New York City. A week of filming for the season in March 2018 took place in the town of Windham, New York, with set photos revealing that the town was representing Fagan Corners, Vermont, the hometown of Karen Page in the comics. The production paid for the renovation of a local store to portray a diner for the series, and used the town's emergency helicopter pad. Additional filming locations for the week included nearby ski areas and a country club. The exterior of the Lotte New York Palace Hotel served as the building of Fisk's penthouse while under FBI surveillance. An abandoned prison in Staten Island was used for the riot sequence in episode four. Filming for the season was completed by mid-June 2018.

"Blindsided" features a long action sequence filmed in a single take. Oleson credited the episode's director Alex Garcia Lopez, writer Lewaa Nasserdeen, and the stunt team for conceiving the idea. Once the sequence was decided, Oleson asked Marvel to give them a full day to rehearse the sequence, which "no one had ever done before", since "it required every single member of the crew to work in perfect sync." Oleson said once "the crew finally pulled it off, it was something spectacular that injected adrenaline into the crew for the remainder of the season." The sequence, which does not feature any hidden edit cuts, was meant to be a "homage, and then one-upping" of the sequence from season one. Several moments were included in the sequence where the editing team could add a cut if needed, though they did not need them. While editing the episode, Oleson increased the lighting in certain shots "so that the audience could see that we never cut the camera". Cox called the completed sequence "amazing", adding it was "a real testament to the stunt team".

Music
Composer John Paesano once again returns for the season. A soundtrack album for the season was released digitally by Hollywood Records on October 19, 2018.

All music composed by John Paesano, unless otherwise noted.

Marketing
By mid-June 2018, discussions were underway regarding the season being promoted at San Diego Comic-Con that year. A teaser trailer for the season was included as a post-credits scene at the end of the second season of Iron Fist. A full trailer for the season was released on October 4, 2018, which also confirmed Bethel's role as Benjamin Poindexter in the season. Cox, Henson, Woll, D'Onofrio, Whalley, Bethel, and Ali promoted the season at New York Comic Con on October 6, 2018.

Release
The third season of Daredevil was released on October 19, 2018 on the streaming service Netflix, worldwide, in Ultra HD 4K. Initially thought to be releasing in 2017, Netflix COO Ted Sarandos stated in July 2016 that the season would not debut until 2018 at the earliest, after The Defenders released on August 18, 2017. Cox was hopeful the season would debut in 2018, and in October 2017, Marvel revealed the season was indeed expected to release in 2018. In mid-September 2018, the season's release date was revealed.

The season, along with the additional Daredevil seasons and the other Marvel Netflix series, was removed from Netflix on March 1, 2022, due to Netflix's license for the series ending and Disney regaining the rights. The season became available on Disney+ in the United States, Canada, United Kingdom, Ireland, Australia, and New Zealand on March 16, ahead of its debut in Disney+'s other markets by the end of 2022.

Critical response
The review aggregation website Rotten Tomatoes reported a 97% approval rating based on 65 reviews, with an average rating of 8.10/10. The website's critical consensus reads, "The Man with No Fear returns to top form with a third season that begins tediously slow but gradually generates comic book thrills, immeasurably helped by the welcome return of Vincent D'Onofrio's menacing Kingpin." Metacritic reported a score of 71 based on 6 reviews.

Notes

References

External links 
 
 

2018 American television seasons
03